The Copa del Generalísimo 1941 Final was the 39th final of the King's Cup. The final was played at Estadio Chamartín in Madrid, on 29 June 1941, being won by Valencia CF, who beat RCD Español 3-1.

Details

References

1941
Copa
RCD Espanyol matches
Valencia CF matches